Lurie is often a Jewish surname, but also an Irish and English surname. The name is sometimes transliterated from/to other languages as Lurye, Luriye (from Russian), Lourié (in French). Other variants include: Lurey (surname), Loria, Luria, Luri, Luryi, Lurier, Laurie, Lourie, Laurier.

Some historians suspect that the family Luria one of the oldest family trees in the world, claiming to trace back at least to King David born c. 1037 BCE, as researched by Neil Rosenstein in his book The Lurie Legacy. According to this theory, it contains many famous members such as Karl Marx, Sigmund Freud, Felix Mendelssohn, Martin Buber, Rashi, and Hezekiah.

List of people with the surname 
 Alison Lurie (1926–2020), American novelist
 Bob Lurie (born 1929), former owner of the San Francisco Giants
 Boris Lurie (1924–2008), American artist
 Dan Lurie (1923–2013), American body building and physical fitness pioneer
 David Lurie (born 1951), South African photographer
 Elliot Lurie (born 1948), lead guitarist and songwriter for the band Looking Glass
 Evan Lurie (born 1954), film and TV composer
 Jacob Lurie (born 1977), American mathematician, professor at Harvard University
 Janine Lurie (born 1972), Australian psychological researcher at Monash University
 Jeffrey Lurie (born 1951), former Hollywood producer turned NFL team owner
 Jessica Lurie, American composer, performance artist and woodwind player,
 John Lurie (born 1952), American actor, musician, painter and producer
 Marty Lurie (born 1972), American professional wrestling manager
 Mitchell Lurie (born 1993), American soccer player
 Morris Lurie (1938–2014), Australian writer
 Peter Lurie (born 1962), American television personality
 Ranan Lurie (born 1932), American Israeli editorial cartoonist and journalist
 Rod Lurie (born 1962), Israeli-American director, screenwriter and former film critic
 Ron Lurie (1941–2020), American politician and businessman
 Zvi Lurie (1906–1968), Israeli politician, signatory of the Israeli declaration of independence

Places 
 Lurie Children's Hospital

Lurye
 Peter Lurye, American composer and lyricist

See also
 Luri (disambiguation)
 Luria

References

Jewish surnames
Yiddish-language surnames